{{DISPLAYTITLE:C16H21NO3}}
The molecular formula C16H21NO3 (molar mass: 275.35 g/mol, exact mass: 275.1521 u) may refer to:

 Homatropine
 Methylenedioxypyrovalerone (MDPV)
 Rolipram

Molecular formulas